Benjamin Rondeau (born 1 October 1983 in Verdun) is a French rower. He competed at the 2008 Summer Olympics, where he won a bronze medal in coxless four.

References

External links 
 
 

Living people
1983 births
French male rowers
Olympic bronze medalists for France
Olympic rowers of France
Rowers at the 2008 Summer Olympics
Olympic medalists in rowing
Medalists at the 2008 Summer Olympics
People from Verdun
Sportspeople from Meuse (department)
European Rowing Championships medalists
21st-century French people